Leptospermum javanicum is a species of tree that is native to Myanmar, western and central Malesia. It has fibrous bark on the trunk, leaves that are much paler on the lower surface, relatively large white flowers and woody fruit.

Description
The branchlets are covered with soft hairs when young and have prominent flanges extending from the base of the leaves. The floral cup is covered with soft, silky hairs and the edges of the sepals are densely hairy.

Taxonomy and naming
Leptospermum javanicum was first formally described in 1826 by Carl Ludwig Blume in the his book Bijdragen tot de Flora van Nederlandsch Indie.

Distribution and habitat

Uses
Isolates from L. javanicum have shown potential as anti-cancer treatments by inducing apoptosis in lung cancer cells and distorting their ability to undergo metastasis.

References

javanicum
Flora of Malesia
Flora of Myanmar
Plants described in 1827